"One Step Ahead" is a song by American soul singer Aretha Franklin. The single containing the song was released by Columbia Records in 1965. "One Step Ahead" was the A-side of the single, and peaked at #18 on the Hot Rhythm & Blues Singles chart. The B-side, "I Can't Wait Until I See My Baby's Face," was taken from her 1964 album Runnin' Out Of Fools. The single was released two years before Aretha achieved stardom when she joined Atlantic Records.

"One Step Ahead" was not included on any of her Columbia studio albums, and remains one of her rarest releases

In 1999, hip-hop producer Ayatollah sampled its chorus for the track "Ms. Fat Booty", produced for Mos Def.

The same vocal part was sampled by Clutchy Hopkins for his "Sleepers Never Dig, Diggers Never Sleep Bootleg" and High Contrast for his song "Remind Me".

In 2022, hip-hop and rap producer DJ Scheme sampled multiple segments from the song, including the chorus part sampled in "Ms. Fat Booty", for "Surround Sound" which he produced for JID's album The Forever Story.

Use in movies

Aretha Franklin's recording of the song has appeared in the music documentary Muscle Shoals (2013) and in the dramatic film, Moonlight (2016).

References

1965 singles
Aretha Franklin songs
1965 songs
Columbia Records singles
Songs written by Charles Singleton (songwriter)
Songs written by Eddie Snyder